KRAY-FM (103.5 FM) is a radio station broadcasting a Regional Mexican format. Licensed to Salinas, California, United States, it serves the Santa Cruz area.  The station is currently owned by CO2 Media.

References

External links

RAY-FM
Radio stations established in 1966
RAY-FM
1966 establishments in California
Santa Cruz, California